Five Patients is a non-fiction book by Michael Crichton that recounts his experiences of hospital practices during the late 1960s at Massachusetts General Hospital in Boston and describes the changes he anticipates in healthcare in coming years. It is his first non-fiction book.

The book describes each of five patients through their hospital experience and the context of their treatment. Crichton notes in the foreword of the 1994 reprint of this book that medical practices (both the culture, technology, and finances) have changed significantly since the book was written, but that the text was left as is to give a more complete glimpse into the past.

The five patients were Ralph Orlando, a construction worker seriously injured in a scaffold collapse; John O'Connor, a middle-aged dispatcher suffering from fever that has reduced him to a delirious wreck; Peter Luchesi, a young man who severs his hand in an accident; Sylvia Thompson, an airline passenger who suffers chest pains; and Edith Murphy, a mother of three who is diagnosed with a life-threatening disease.

Crichton recounts a brief history of medicine until 1969 to help contextualize hospital culture and practice and mentions national healthcare, drug prices, healthcare costs, and healthcare politics. The increasing cost of healthcare is a major theme – then at 15% per year.

He quotes Dr. James Howard Means, who is critical of the American Medical Association: "every attempt has been made by liberally-minded groups to improve medical care and make it more accessible...the AMA has attacked with ever increasing truculence... They forget perhaps that medicine is for the people, not for the doctors. They need some enlightenment on this point."

References 

 Crichton, Michael, Five Patients, Ballantine Books, 

American non-fiction books
Books by Michael Crichton
1970 non-fiction books
Massachusetts General Hospital
Alfred A. Knopf books